Hajo Meyer (born Hans Joachim Gustav Meyer; 12 August 1924 – 23 August 2014) was a German-born Dutch physicist, Holocaust survivor and political activist. While primarily known for his public commentaries in terms of the European Jewish community, he is also noted for his work directing the facility Philips Natuurkundig Laboratorium for many years.

Early life
Meyer was born in Bielefeld, the son of Therese (Melchior) and Gustav Meyer, a notary, who had fought in the First World War. Meyer was Jewish. Aged 14, he was sent by his parents from Nazi Germany to the Netherlands on 4 January 1939 as part of a Kindertransport convoy, and settled in Holland on his own. Their decision was made after Hajo was no longer permitted to attend school in the aftermath of Kristallnacht, His parents' maxim was: 'We do not dote to death on children' (bei uns gibt es keine Affenliebe). He went into hiding in 1943, but was arrested after a year and spent ten months in Auschwitz. After Auschwitz he swore would never speak German again. He broke the rule at a scientific conference in Amsterdam after the war, when he happened to be speaking on a similar topic to that discussed by Hermann Haken.

His parents had originally been deported to Theresienstadt concentration camp in 1943, and after his father succumbed to an illness on 15 May 1944, it was decided that there was no more reason to allow his widow Therese to stay on, and that she should be deported to Auschwitz. She had hidden a cyanide capsule in a piece of bread and chose suicide, knowing that the chances of survival there were non-existent. His correspondence with his parents while in exile during the war were published. The autobiography of his elder brother, Alfred, also dwells on their experiences during the war.

Post-Holocaust
After the war, Meyer returned to the Netherlands, and studied theoretical physics. He eventually became director of the Phillips Physics Laboratory (NatLab). After his retirement he took courses in woodwork and constructed violins and violas.

Later career
In his later years, Meyer became politically active, including as director of A Different Jewish Voice. He wrote Het einde van het Jodendom (The End of Judaism) in 2003, which accuses Israel of abusing the Holocaust to justify crimes against the Palestinians. In the book he is reported to have used phrases such as the "Israeli Wehrmacht," and the "Jewish SS." In lectures, he argued that "what is happening to the Palestinians every day under the occupation" was "almost identical" with "what was done to the German Jews even before the 'Final Solution,'" and also maintained that Israel's demeanour is the main cause of the post-war re-emergence of anti-Semitism.' He was a member of the International Jewish Anti-Zionist Network.

Meyer repeatedly argued that there are parallels between the Nazi treatment of Jews leading to (but not including) the Holocaust, and Israel's dehumanization of Palestinians. At one talk, organized and hosted by the leader of the UK's Labour Party, Jeremy Corbyn, in 2010, Meyer was later reported to have repeatedly likened Israel's actions against the people of the Gaza Strip to the mass killing of Jews in the Holocaust and likened the government of Israel to that of Nazi Germany. During the talk, Meyer said that "Judaism in Israel has been substituted by the Holocaust religion, whose high priest is Elie Wiesel."

He participated in the 2011 "Never Again – For Anyone" tour. Meyer argued there are different interpretations of Judaism, and that Jews ought to return to the principles of the Book of Leviticus and the rabbinical principles of figures like Hillel, and avoid the 'doomsday Judaism' he identifies in the Book of Joshua and the positions of Abraham Isaac Kook which have in his view underwritten Zionism.

Meyer claimed Zionism predates fascism, that Zionists and fascists had a history of cooperation charging, among other things, that Israel wants to foment anti-Semitism in the world to encourage more Jews to migrate to Israel.

Meyer spoke in favor of the Boycott, Divestment and Sanctions movement against Israel. In his last recorded interview, coinciding with the 2014 Israel-Gaza Conflict, Meyer lambasted Zionists as Nazi criminals, asserted that German hatred of Jews was less deeply grounded than Israeli-Jewish hatred of Palestinians, and denounced PM Benjamin Netanyahu's remarks that demonstrations against the war were evidence of hatred of Israel. He was the first signatory of a statement by 250 Holocaust and descendants of Holocaust survivors protesting that war.

Theory of "sequential traumatizing" of Jews
Meyer developed a theory based on the work of Hans Keilson regarding "sequential traumatizing," according to which Jewish collective remembering in a ritual setting of numerous past traumatic events befalling the community. Meyer argues that the current government of Israel has used this re-traumatization of Jews with regard to the Holocaust, in order to indoctrinate and inculcate loyalty to Israel against its enemies. He applied this to the Israeli-Palestinian conflict, arguing that Israel dehumanizes Palestinians the same way that Nazi Germany dehumanized Jews. He expanded on this sense of an analogy in the following terms:
I cannot help but hear echoes of the Nazi mythos of "blood and soil" in the rhetoric of settler fundamentalism which claims a sacred right to all the lands of biblical Judea and Samaria. The various forms of collective punishment visited upon the Palestinian people — coerced ghettoization behind a "security wall"; the bulldozing of homes and destruction of fields; the bombing of schools, mosques, and government buildings; an economic blockade that deprives people of the water, food, medicine, education and the basic necessities for dignified survival — force me to recall the deprivations and humiliations that I experienced in my youth.

Accusation of antisemitism
On appeal, a court mostly cleared Broder, stating that there was no such thing as "Jewish anti-Semitism."

Death
On 23 August 2014, Meyer died in his sleep in Heiloo, Netherlands at the age of 90.

References

Notes

Citations

External links

  Het einde van het Jodendom
 An Ethical Tradition Betrayed

1924 births
2014 deaths
Articles containing video clips
20th-century Dutch physicists
Dutch activists
Jewish anti-Zionism in Germany
Auschwitz concentration camp survivors
Scientists from Bielefeld
Jewish emigrants from Nazi Germany to the Netherlands